Harmony, formerly GALA, Gay and Lesbian Acceptance, is a non-profit organization for LGBTQIA+ people, allies, and their family and friends who are connected with Community of Christ.

Harmony's mission is "to provide advocacy, education, and resources for Queer/2SLGBTQIA+ voices in Community of Christ with a shared vision of full participation." Its stated purpose is to "affirm the dignity and worth of all persons without regard to gender, race, sexual orientation, or religious affiliation".

However, Harmony's official website contradicts the above statement with, "Harmony provides advocacy, education, and resources for Queer voices...The term Queer is being reclaimed by some who identify as LGBTQ+ and is used as an umbrella term for the LGBTQ+ community. We use the phrase 'Queer voices' to describe all persons, regardless of sexual orientation or gender identity (SOGI), who have the courage to use their voice to speak for justice for the marginalized in the Queer community."
 
Many who are a part of the 2SLGBTQ+ Community of Christ membership and their allies do not identify as Queer and bear the heavy weight that word carries with it. Though they have not asked anyone who has reclaimed for themselves the word Queer to renounce it, they have asked for Harmony and Harmony's supporters to not use Queer as an umbrella term as it does not accurately, faithfully, or authentically represent all 2SLGBTQ+ members within Community of Christ. As of yet, Harmony refuses to uphold the worth and dignity of non-Queer identifying members, withholding the blessings of community for non-Queers.

The organization works closely with some individual members, some congregations, and Community of Christ leaders at all levels to advocate for Queer/2SLGBTQIA+ persons.

Several Community of Christ leaders are dues-paying Harmony members, causing concerns of conflicts of interest being both a member of an advocacy organization as well as being the leaders that same organization approaches to advocate. Apostle Robin Linkhart who is an advisor for Harmony, is also a dues-paying Harmony member, and a member of Community of Christ's Council of Twelve Apostles.

Although Harmony is not formally affiliated with Community of Christ, most of its members have a connection to the Independence, Missouri-based church.

History
GALA was founded by Bob Swoffer, and its first gathering was in 1982. Arthur Butler and Ginger Farley were founding members, and Allan Fiscus was the first president of GALA. In 2019, GALA legally merged with the Welcoming Community Network, a non-profit organization serving Community of Christ congregations seeking to become welcoming and affirming, and took the name Harmony.

See also

LGBT-welcoming church programs
Affirmation: LGBTQ Mormons, Families, & Friends

References

Further reading
 "Church Leaders Gather to Understand Needs of Gay, Lesbian Church Members", Eastern Jackson County Examiner, 2005-01-31
William D. Russell, "Homosexuals in the RLDS Church: A Progress Report" (paper presented at the Sunstone Symposium in Salt Lake City, Utah on 1999-07-17)

External links
Harmony Facebook page

1982 establishments in the United States
Community of Christ
LGBT Latter Day Saint organizations
LGBT in Missouri
LGBT organizations in the United States
Non-profit organizations based in Kansas City, Missouri
Latter Day Saint movement in Missouri
Christian organizations established in 1982